Gaita may refer to:

Musical instruments
Gaita (bagpipe), various types of bagpipes common to northern Spain and Portugal:
Gaita asturiana, a bagpipe used in the Spanish provinces of Asturias, northern León and western Cantabria
Galician gaita, or gaita de foles, a bagpipe used in the Spanish provinces of Galicia, León, western Zamora, and in Trás-os-Montes, Portugal
Gaita alistana, a bagpipe used in Aliste, Zamora, north-western Spain.
Gaita cabreiresa, or gaita llionesa ("Leonese gaita"), an extinct but revived pipe native to León.
Gaita de boto, a bagpipe native to Aragon, distinctive for its tenor drone running parallel to the chanter
Gaita de saco, or gaita de bota, a bagpipe native to Soria, La Rioja, Álava, and Burgos in north-central Spain. Possibly the same as the lost gaita de fuelle of Old Castile.
Gaita sanabresa, a bagpipe played in Puebla de Sanabria, in the Zamora province of western Spain
Gaita transmontana, also known as gaita-de-fole transmontana or gaita mirandesa ("Mirandese gaita"), a bagpipe native to the Trás-os-Montes region of Portugal
Gaita gastoreña, a hornpipe musical instrument native to El Gastor, Andalusia
Gaita navarra, a flute named after the Navarre region of Spain
Colombian gaita (gaita colombiana), the Spanish name for kuisi, fipple flutes native to Colombia and parts of Panama

Music
 Gaïta, an early music ensemble  
 Gaita Zuliana, a Venezuelan musical genre

People
 Raimond Gaita (born 1946), Australian philosopher and writer

See also
 Gaida, a Balkans bagpipe
 Ghaita or Rhaita, a north-west African shawm like wind instrument